The 1990 Women's Asian Games Basketball Tournament was held in China from September 23, 1990 to October 6, 1990.

Results

Preliminary round

Final round

Bronze medal game

Gold medal game

Final standing

References
Results

External links
Basketball Results

women